Brevibacterium yomogidense is a Gram-positive and rod-shaped bacterium from the genus of Brevibacterium.

References

Micrococcales
Bacteria described in 2013